Nice 'n Juicy is an Australian television sitcom which first screened on the ABC in 1966.

Cast
 Willie Fennell as Jack Hamlin
 John Ewart as Mort Hamlin
 Carmen Duncan as Rosie Withers
 Gwen Plumb as Ada Withers

See also
 List of Australian television series

References

External links
 
 Nice 'n Juicy at Classic Television Australia

1966 Australian television series debuts
1967 Australian television series endings
Australian television sitcoms
Australian Broadcasting Corporation original programming
Black-and-white Australian television shows
English-language television shows